Rhea Kapoor (born 5 March 1987) is an Indian film producer. She is also the owner of the fashion line Rheson alongside her sister Sonam Kapoor.

Early and personal life
Kapoor is the daughter of actor Anil Kapoor and his wife Sunita, she is the sister of actors Sonam Kapoor and Harshvardhan Kapoor, granddaughter of filmmaker Surinder Kapoor, niece of filmmaker Boney Kapoor and his wives, the late producer Mona Shourie Kapoor and the late actress Sridevi, and actor Sanjay Kapoor. Her cousins are actors Arjun Kapoor, Janhvi Kapoor and Mohit Marwah as well as actor Ranveer Singh. Kapoor pursued her graduation in "Dramatic literature" from New York University

Kapoor married her partner of 12 years, Karan Boolani, in an intimate wedding at her family's residence in 2021.

Career
Kapoor started her career as a film producer with Rajshree Ojha's film Aisha in 2010, which starred her sister Sonam and Abhay Deol in leading roles. She later produced the 2014 film Khoobsurat, directed by Shashanka Ghosh, which is an official remake of Hrishikesh Mukherjee directed film by the same name. In 2017, she launched the clothing line of Rheson with her sister Sonam Kapoor.

Kapoor has co-produced Veere Di Wedding, which released on 1 June 2018.

Filmography

As producer

References

External links
 

Living people
Indian women film producers
Hindi film producers
Sindhi people
Film producers from Mumbai
Businesswomen from Maharashtra
21st-century Indian businesswomen
21st-century Indian businesspeople
1987 births